

Immunology